Gibberula almadiensis is a species of sea snail, a marine gastropod mollusk, in the family Cystiscidae.

Distribution
This marine species occurs off Senegal.

References

External links
 MNHN, Paris : holotype

almadiensis
Gastropods described in 1995
Cystiscidae